Santiago de Machaca is the first municipal section of the José Manuel Pando Province in the  La Paz Department, Bolivia. Its seat is Santiago de Machaca.

See also 
 Llallawa
 Misa Willk'i
 Tatitu Qullu
 Thujsa Jawira
 Wari Kunka

References 

  Instituto Nacional de Estadistica de Bolivia  (INE)

Municipalities of La Paz Department (Bolivia)